Jail is a 2018 Nigerian film directed and produced by Morris K. Sesay.

Plot
The film tells a story of man who has been jailed for committing a crime he never did, while the perpetrator of the crime who is his friends runs away.

Cast
 Bimbo Akintola
 Rotimi Salami
 Chelsea Eze
 Ronke Odusanya
 Allwell Ademola
 Ngozi Nwosu
 Morris Sesay

References

Nigerian crime drama films
English-language Nigerian films